Psychrolutes marmoratus is a species of marine ray-finned fish belonging to the family Psychrolutidae, the fatheads. This is a demersal fish which is found in the southwestern Atlantic and southeastern Pacific Oceans off Chilean and Argentinian Patagonia.

References

marmoratus
Fish described in 1889
Taxa named by Theodore Gill